State Highway 290 (SH 290) is a state highway maintained by the Texas Department of Transportation (TxDOT) that runs from Interstate 10 near Sheffield east to another connection with I-10 about  east of Sheffield.  The  route was designated in 1992 as a replacement for U.S. Route 290 when that route was shortened to end near Junction. The route connects I-10 to Sheffield and Fort Lancaster State Historic Site and overlays a portion of SH 349.

SH 290 was the former designation for a portion of SH 114 between the New Mexico state line and Lubbock.

History

Cochran, Hockley, and Lubbock counties
SH 290 was originally designated as a route from the New Mexico state line east through Morton and Levelland to Lubbock in Cochran, Hockley, and Lubbock counties that was created on September 26, 1939. The route had been previously numbered as SH 134 beginning sometime between 1926 and 1928 until the route was renumbered as SH 24 on March 19, 1930. The SH 290 designation was dropped on March 31, 1955 when the route became SH 116. On December 14, 1977, the SH 116 designation was canceled, and the route became an extension of SH 114.

Pecos and Crockett counties
SH 290 was created on November 21, 1991 from a portion of US 290 which was decommissioned beyond its current terminus at I-10 near Junction to its former terminus at US 80 near Kent. US 290 together with US 80 formed a route linking El Paso to Austin and Houston before the construction of I-10. SH 290 is a portion of the former US 290 that was bypassed by I-10 around Sheffield.

Route description

SH 290 begins at Exit 325 of I-10 in Pecos County and winds southward around hills concurrently with SH 349. The road turns east through Sheffield passing through town along Main Street where SH 349 turns to the south. SH 290 then runs southeast to the Pecos River where the road enters Crockett County. The road turns eastward along the Pecos River valley until it reaches Fort Lancaster, an old frontier Army fort maintained by the Texas Parks and Wildlife Department. The road then turns northeast climbing steeply out of the river valley and returns to I-10 at Exit 343.

Major intersections

See also

References

External links

290
Transportation in Pecos County, Texas
Transportation in Crockett County, Texas